6th Machine Gun Battalion may refer to:

 6th Machine Gun Battalion (Australia)
 6th Machine Gun Battalion (United States Marine Corps)